The Kalkrieser Berg (also called the Schmittenhöhe) is a hill, 157 m, between the villages of Venne and Engter, in the district of Osnabrück. The Kalkrieser Berg is a northern bulge of the Wiehen Hills.

Most historians believe that the narrow point, between the Kalkrieser Berg and the great bog, was where the decisive Battle of the Teutoburg Forest between the Romans and the Germanic tribes took place. In the area of  Kalkriese artifacts believed to be from the battle have been recovered and many are on display in the Kalkriese Museum and Park.

References 

Archaeological sites in Germany
History of Lower Saxony
Wiehen Hills
Osnabrück (district)